Albany is a city in Shackelford County, Texas, United States. The population was 2,034 at the 2010 Census. It is the county seat of Shackelford County.

History

Established in 1873, Albany was named by county clerk William Cruger after his former home of Albany, Georgia.

Lieutenant Colonel William Dyess, survivor of the Bataan Death March in the Philippines and namesake of Dyess Air Force Base, was born in Albany on August 9, 1916.

Major General Robert B. Williams, who led the World War II aerial bombing raid on Schweinfurt, Germany, was born in Albany on November 9, 1901.

Geography
Albany is located northeast of Abilene, the seat of Taylor County.

According to the United States Census Bureau, the city has a total area of 1.5 square miles (3.8 km2), all land.

Climate

Demographics

2020 census

As of the 2020 United States census, there were 1,854 people, 686 households, and 405 families residing in the city.

2000 census
As of the census of 2000,  1,921 people, 746 households, and 531 families resided in the city. The population density was 1,305.9 people per square mile (504.6/km2). The 880 housing units averaged 598.2 per square mile (231.1/km2). The racial makeup of the city was 93.13% White, 0.68% African American, 0.47% Native American, 4.84% from other races, and 0.88% from two or more races. Hispanics or Latinos of any race were 8.07% of the population.

Of the 746 households, 33.1% had children under the age of 18 living with them, 59.1% were married couples living together, 8.7% had a female householder with no husband present, and 28.7% were not families. Of all households, 27.3% were made up of individuals, and 16.1% had someone living alone who was 65 years of age or older. The average household size was 2.51 and the average family size was 3.08.

In the city, the population was distributed as 27.0% under the age of 18, 6.4% from 18 to 24, 25.4% from 25 to 44, 23.0% from 45 to 64, and 18.3% who were 65 years of age or older. The median age was 39 years. For every 100 females, there were 86.9 males. For every 100 females age 18 and over, there were 83.2 males.

Males had a median income of $28,846 versus $17,411 for females. The per capita income for the city was $17,470. About 8.1% of families and 9.2% of the population were below the poverty line, including 10.1% of those under age 18 and 11.1% of those age 65 or over.

Schools
Albany is served by the Albany Independent School District.  Their mascot is the Lion and their school colors are red and white.

 Nancy Smith Elementary (Grades PK–6)
 2006 National Blue Ribbon School
 Albany Junior/Senior High School (Grades 7–12)

Fort Griffin Fandangle

Since 1938, Texas' oldest outdoor musical, the Fort Griffin Fandangle, has been presented during the last two weekends of June in the Prairie Theater about historic Fort Griffin, a military outpost established in 1867 near Albany and now a state park. The program, the content of which is different each year, attempts to recapture the theatrical charm of the American West.

The show offers covered wagons and buggies, a stagecoach, a replica of the first Texas Central Railroad train, an oil derrick, and cowboys whose ancestors pushed Longhorn herds up the nearby Great Western Cattle Trail. The Dallas Morning News describes Fandangle, accordingly: "as professional as a multimillion dollar Broadway musical, with sets and costumes to match, with a cast of three hundred". The Abilene Reporter-News calls the program "Frontier history served up with genuine earthiness, spiced by rare humor."

References

External links

 www.albanytexas.org Albany's City Hall website
 Albany's Chamber of Commerce website
 The Albany News
 Fort Griffin Fandangle Association
 The Old Jail Art Center
 Albany Independent School District
 Fort Griffin State Park
 Handbook of Texas

Cities in Shackelford County, Texas
Cities in Texas
County seats in Texas